The Rakhi-Munh mine is one of the largest gypsum mines in Pakistan. The mine is in Punjab. The mine has reserves amounting to 27 million tonnes of gypsum.

References 

Mines in Pakistan
Gypsum mines in Pakistan